is a Japanese comedian who performs tsukkomi in the comedy duo Black Mayonnaise. His standing position is on the left. His partner is Takashi Yoshida.

Kosugi is represented with Yoshimoto Kogyo. He graduated from Kyoto Prefectural Katsura High School. In 12 November 2010 Kosugi married a former dental assistant from Osaka Prefecture.

Filmography
 TV programmes

 TV anime

 Films

 Advertisements

Bibliography

References

Japanese comedians
Japanese people of American descent
People from Kyoto
1973 births
Living people